Syndemis afflictana, the gray leafroller, dead leaf roller or black-and-gray banded leafroller, is a species of moth of the  family Tortricidae. It is found in North America, where it has been recorded from southern Canada and the northern United States. In the west, the range extends south in the mountains to California. The species is also present in Florida. The habitat consists of coniferous forests.

The wingspan is 18–23 mm. The basal half of the forewings is silvery, while the distal half is brownish-grey. Adults are on wing in May and June in the north and from April to June in the southern part of the range. There is one generation per year.

The larvae feed on various trees, including Pseudotsuga menziesii, Abies lasiocarpa, Abies balsamea, Alnus, Malus, Betula papyrifera, Acer, Picea, Larix laricina and Salix species. The larvae have a yellowish-green body and green head. They reach a length of about 20 mm when full-grown. They can be found from May to early June and again from late July to October. The species overwinters in the larval stage.

References

	

Moths described in 1863
Archipini